The Wa National Unity Party (WNUP) is a political party in Myanmar (Burma). It was founded by members of the former Wa National Development Party, which contested the 1990 general elections but did not win any seats. The party has sought to distance itself from the United Wa State Army in order to enter mainstream politics. The WNUP works together with the Nationalities Brotherhood Federation, an alliance of 23 ethnic political parties in Myanmar.

History 
The WNUP contested 16 constituencies in the 2015 general election, winning only a single seat in the Shan State Hluttaw.

On 4 September 2015, the WNUP's leader went to Wa State and met with Vice President Xiao Mingliang.

References

2010 establishments in Myanmar
Political parties established in 2010
Political parties in Myanmar
Wa political parties